The history of Bible translations into Icelandic began with the country's conversion to Christianity around  but efforts accelerated with the Icelandic Reformation in the mid-16th century. Since then, 11 complete translations of the Bible have been completed into Icelandic. Currently, the  oversees translation and production of Icelandic-language Bibles with the most recent full translation completed in 2007.

Pre-Reformation
With the Christianization of Iceland, so-called þýðingar helgar (weekend translations) were written in Old Norse/Old Icelandic to help explain the new religion and practices to the populace. These included religious interpretations alongside translations of Bible stories. The oldest Icelandic biblical texts date to  when the Old Icelandic Homily Book, which compiled sermons, lessons, and prayers. During the following century, more systematic efforts were made to translate sections of the Bible, eventually being collected into the Stjórn around 1350.

By the early 16th century, the only Icelandic translation available was Catholic Bishop Jón Arason's translations of the four Gospels, although copies of this work have not survived.

Post-Reformation
When the Reformation reached Iceland in the mid-16th century, a full translation of the Bible into Icelandic was needed. This work began with a translation of the New Testament by Oddur Gottskálksson published in Roskilde in 1540 (text here). Oddur's translation followed the Latin Vulgate with reference to Martin Luther's 1552 German translation.

Guðbrandur Þorláksson, the Protestant bishop at Hólar, published the first complete translation, the Guðbrandsbiblía, in 1584. Guðbrandur's Old Testament translation was based on Luther's 1534 full German translation and Christian III's 1550 Danish translation. The New Testament used Oddur’s translation with corrections. It is believed that Oddur translated the Psalms and Gissur Einarsson translated the Book of Proverbs and Book of Sirach. It is possible Guðbrandur himself translated other books of the Old Testament.

Afterwards, a number of other translations followed, such the 1644  overseen by Bishop Þorlákur Skúlason and printer Halldór Ásmundsson in Hólar and the 1747 Waysenhússbiblía printed by Det Kongelige Vajsenhus in Copenhagen.

This edition (just the New Testament and Psalms) was edited by Eiríkur Magnússon and reprinted in 1866 in two editions: a single volume with the New Testament and Psalms and a set with the full Old and New Testaments. Both the 1863 and 1866 editions were printed by the British Bible Society at Oxford. These translations were used for the 1903 illustrated New Testament of the Scripture Gift Mission (London & Akureyri).

The current publisher of the Icelandic Bible is the Icelandic Bible Society, which was founded on 10 July 1815 with the goal of making the Bible widely available and accessible in Iceland. In 1859 it printed the so-called , essentially the Viðeyjarbiblía from 18 years earlier. By 1899, the society was printing the Old Testament translations of Þórir Kr. Þórðarson, which were used into the early 21st century.  The latest full translation, a new complete translation by Guðrún Guðlaugsdóttir, was published in 2007.

List of translations
In total, 11 Icelandic versions of the Bible have been published with revisions made with each new version.

Translations of the full Bible:
 Guðbrandsbiblía, Hólum, Norway 1584
 , Hólum 1637–1644
 , Hólum 1728 (1734)
 Waysenhússbiblía, Copenhagen 1747
 , (Hendersonsbiblía), Copenhagen 1813
 , Viðey 1841
 , Reykjavík 1859
 , London 1866
 , 1908-1912 Reykjavík (reprinted)
 , Reykjavík 1981
 , Reykjavík 2007

New Testament translations include:
 Nýja testamenti Odds Gottskálkssonar Roskilde, Denmark 1540
 Nýja testamenti Guðbrands, Hólum, Norway 1609
 Waysenhúss-Nýja testamenti, Copenhagen 1746 and 1750
 Nýja testamenti, Copenhagen 1807
 Nýja testamentið, Viðey 1825 and 1827
 Nýja testamentið, Reykjavík 1851
 Nýja testamentið, Oxford 1863 and 1866
 Nýja testamentið, Akureyri and London 1903
 Nýja testamentið (Ný Þýðing), Reykjavík 1906 and 1914 (reprinted)

Comparison of text

References

Further reading 

 This chapter provides an extended discussion of the translations up until Guðbrand's and Powell's time.

External links
The entire Bible (minus Apocrypha; translation undetermined) from the Icelandic Bible Society.
The entire Bible as audio-book (hljóðbók) for free download.
Nýja testamenti Oddur Gottskálkssonar.
Details of Icelandic versions

Icelandic
Icelandic language